Rashid Toleutaiuly Tusupbekov (Raşid Töleutaiūly Tüsıpbekov) is a Kazakh politician who was the Prosecutor General of Kazakhstan.

See also
Government of Kazakhstan

References

1955 births
Living people
Government ministers of Kazakhstan